Pierre Balmain S.A. trading as Balmain, is a French luxury fashion house that was founded by Pierre Balmain (1914–1982) in 1945. It operates 16 monobrand stores, including locations in New York City, London, Los Angeles, Las Vegas, Miami, and in Milan's Via Montenapoleone.

In 2016, Mayhoola Investments acquired Balmain for a figure reportedly close to €500 million ($548 million). Balmain was 70 percent controlled by heirs of Alain Hivelin. The company does not regularly release financial information, but Les Echos estimated its revenue in 2015 at €120 million (about $136 million), growing from an estimated €30 million (about $34 million) in 2012. Balmain expected to reach a revenue of €150 million in 2017, 90% of which is generated by the wholesale channel, and is also putting more effort into direct retail.

History
Balmain was born in 1914 in France. His father owned a drapery business and his mother and sister owned a fashion boutique where he often worked after his father's death in 1921. He attended the École des Beaux-Arts in 1933–1934, with intent to study architecture but instead ended up spending the majority of his time designing dresses.  After working for atelier Robert Piquet as a freelance artist and spending time with Edward Molyneux, he left school to work for Molyneux. In the late 1930s, he served in the French air force and the army pioneer corps. After peace was declared, he worked at Lucien Lelong and opened his own fashion house under his name at 44, rue François 1er in Paris. He released his first collection in October 1945 and his first fragrance, Jolie Madame in 1949.

In the period following World War II, Pierre Balmain was "a king of French fashion" and outfitted stars including Ava Gardner and Brigitte Bardot, the Nicaraguan first lady Hope Portocarrero, and Queen Sirikit of Thailand. Marlene Dietrich wore Balmain clothes that she selected in "No Highway in the Sky" (1951).

Successors
After Balmain's death in 1982, the house was led by Erik Mortensen, described by Vogue as "Pierre Balmain's right hand". Mortensen had joined the house to work as Balmain's assistant in 1951. After succeeding Balmain, Eric Mortensen worked to maintain the brand aesthetic in the ever-living world of couture while still maintaining the progressive spirit of creativity in the fashion industry. The Balmain house recruits Peggy Huynh Kinh in 1982 to provide artistic direction for women's ready-to-wear and women's and home accessories license studios. Eric Mortensen won two Golden Thimble awards for his haute couture collections, one for the Autumn/Winter 83/84 and one for the Autumn/Winter 87/88.  He left the house in 1990. After his departure, designer Hervé Pierre took over until 1992 working as director of ready-to-wear and haute couture.

Possibly the most influential designer to take over at Balmain was Oscar de la Renta, who led the house between 1993 and 2002.  Already a fashion veteran before joining Balmain, De la Renta brought a famous face to the brand Balmain. He lived in New York City most of his life, although he was born in the Dominican Republic and became a naturalized United States citizen in 1971. He fit into the Balmain design aesthetic, with an eye for detail and classic silhouettes. He, like Balmain, preferred modest and simple design rather than extremely ornamental and flashy styles. Couture had been suffering at the time since it was an extremely impractical business, so Oscar joined the brand in order to challenge himself and to help it through the beginning of the decline of couture.

After Oscar de la Renta's departure Christophe Decarnin joined the house in 2005. Contrary to all the designers before him, Decarnin insisted on bringing the brand into the 21st century. He favored expensive prices and flashy pieces that sharply contrasted with the label's reputation for its classic and luxurious designs. He was considered a "star designer", and the brand became more about his star status than about its clothes. In April 2011, Balmain announced that Decarnin was to be replaced by Olivier Rousteing.

Rousteing had joined the company in 2009, after attending a prestigious French fashion school and working under Roberto Cavalli. While he liked Decarnin's aesthetic, he wanted to orient the label towards the finer aspects of French couture. At the time of his appointment, Rousteing was a relatively unknown designer, and has brought a fresh take on the brand's aesthetic that remains to this day. He was credited with adding an Asian influence to the clothing, as Asia comprises a huge part of the brand's buyers.

Recent history
 in 1969 the singer/songwriter Peter Sarstedt hits the top 40 with the song "Where Do You Go To (My Lovely)?". In the first couplet he sings about Balmain: "You talk like Marlene Dietrich and you dance like Zizi Jeanmaire. Your clothes are all made by Balmain and there's diamonds and pearls in your hair - yes there are."
In 2013, Balmain introduced their Care and Styling for Hair Couture.
 In November 2015, Balmain released their collaboration with the international Swedish retail store H&M.
In April 2016, Balmain opened its New York flagship store in Soho.
 On June 22, 2016, Balmain announced that their new owner will be Mayhoola Investments.
 In 2017, Balmain's creative director Olivier Rousteing debuts Balmain's first accessory line.
 On September 1, 2017, Balmain introduced their lipstick collection which was collaborated with L’Oreal.
On November 29, 2017, Balmain launched a capsule collection with Victoria's Secret.
On December 4, 2018, Olivier Rousteing introduces Balmain's new logo.
On September 24, 2019, Balmain announced the capsule makeup collection, KYLIE X BALMAIN, a collaboration with cosmetics entrepreneur, Kylie Jenner. Jenner was also named Artistic Director for Makeup for the Spring-Summer 2020 Runway Collection.

Licensing 
As of 2012, 50% of the company's total income is from license royalties.

Balmain and Inter Perfums Inc. 
Licensing, development & production deal for 12 years starting from January 2012.

$1.9 million, in fragrance sales in 2012, rising to $6.8 million in 2014

$4.2 million in 2016 sales declined 21 percent at average exchange declining 5.8 percent the previous year. Olivier terminated this contract in March 2017 due to declining sales. Production was turned over to Inter Parfums America temporarily, until Balmain can work out a deal with a new distributor for its 12 fragrances.

Head designers of Balmain
 1945–1982: Pierre Balmain
1982–1986: Peggy Huynh Kinh
 1982–1990: Erik Mortensen
 1990–1992: Hervé Pierre Braillard
 1993–2002: Oscar de la Renta
 2002-2003: Laurent Mercier
 2003–2006: Christophe Lebourg
 2006–2011: Christophe Decarnin
 2011–: Olivier Rousteing

From 1947 to 1976 Balmain's  (director) was Ginette Spanier.

References

External links
 NY Magazine profile 

Clothing companies of France
Haute couture
High fashion brands
Luxury brands
French brands
Companies based in Paris
Clothing companies established in 1946
Design companies established in 1946
French companies established in 1946
Companies that filed for Chapter 11 bankruptcy in 2004
8th arrondissement of Paris